Iuga may refer to
 Iuga of Moldavia, Prince of Moldavia in 1399–1400
 Dan Iuga (born 1945), Romanian-American pistol shooter and coach
 Nora Iuga (born 1931), Romanian poet, writer and translator

Romanian-language surnames
Surnames of Moldovan origin